Colotis liagore, the desert orange tip, is a butterfly in the family Pieridae. It is found in Mauritania, northern Senegal, northern Nigeria, Niger, Chad, Sudan, Ethiopia, Somalia, Arabia and the Baluchistan coast of Iran, United Arab Emirates and Pakistan. The habitat consists of moist savanna.

The larvae feed on Maerua and Capparis species.

References

Butterflies described in 1829
liagore
Butterflies of Asia